Paul Franklin Dicken (born October 2, 1943 in DeLand, Florida) is a former Major League Baseball player who played for two seasons. The ,  Dicken batted 13 times for the Indians, did not register a hit or a base on balls, and struck out six times.

In 344 minor league games, he batted .263 and hit 61 home runs.

External links

1943 births
Living people
Cleveland Indians players
People from DeLand, Florida
Charleston Indians players